The Mayor of Dharan is the head of the municipal executive of Dharan. The role was created in 1958.

The mayor as of 2022 is Harka Raj Rai. The position has been held by six people.

The city is governed by the Dharan Sub-Metropolitan City Council and the mayor is supported by the municipal executive which consists of the deputy mayor and ward chairs of Dharan's 20 wards.

Responsibilities 
The mayor is elected for a five-year term that is renewable only once. The municipal executive is formed under the chairmanship of the mayor. The local government in Nepal has authority over the local units pursuant to Schedule 8 of the Constitution of Nepal. The mayor derives its power from the Local Government Operation Act, 2017.

The mayor's powers are:
 Summon and chair meetings of the municipal assembly and the municipal executive
 Table agendas and proposals to the assembly and executive
 Prepare and present the annual programmes and budget
 Enforce the decisions of the assembly and executive
 Oversee the work of committees and sub-committees of the municipality and ward committees.

The mayor of Dharan is also a member of the Sunsari District Assembly.

Election 
The mayor is elected though first-past-the-post voting. In order to qualify as a candidate for mayor, the person must be a citizen of Nepal, must be over twenty-one, must be registered in the electoral roll of Dharan Sub-Metropolitan City and not be disqualified by law.

List of mayors

Panchayat era (1960–1990)

Constitutional monarchy (1990-2008)

Federal Democratic Republic of Nepal (2017-present)

See also
Dharan
2022 Dharan municipal election
Mayor of Kathmandu
List of mayors of Pokhara
Mayor of Hetauda

References 

People from Dharan
Lists of mayors
Lists of political office-holders in Nepal